Herpothallon polyisidiatum is a species of corticolous (bark-dwelling), crustose lichen in the family Arthoniaceae. Found in China, it was formally described as a new species in 2022 by Pengfei Chen and Lulu Zhang. The lichen contains stictic acid, a lichen product that can be detected using thin-layer chromatography. The species epithet refers to polyisidiatum refers to the pseudisidia, which are plentiful in this species.

References

Arthoniomycetes
Lichen species
Lichens described in 2022
Lichens of China